Audaxlytoceras is an extinct genus of lytoceratid ammonites.

Taxonomy
The Middle Jurassic Nannolytoceras is its closest relative. Aegolytoceras and Peripleuroceras Tutcher and Trueman 1925 are synonyms.

Fossil record
This genus is known in the fossil record from the Lower Jurassic (Pliensbachian)  (from about 190.8 to 182.7 million years ago). Fossils of species within this genus have been found in France, Germany, Italy, Morocco and Spain.

Description
Its shell is small, smooth, evolute (all whorls showing), only slightly impressed dorsally (along the inner rim). Whorls are compressed, subquadrate in section, higher than wide, with few narrow constrictions. The suture relatively simple with a long ventral lobe and two lateral lobes.

Bibliography
Arkell et al., 1957.  Mesozoic Ammonoidea, Systematic Descriptions. Treatise on Invertebrate Paleontology Part L, Ammonoidea.  Geol Soc of Amer. and Univ Kans. Press. L199
Fantini Sestini N. (1973). Revisione del genere “Audaxlytoceras” Fucini, 1923 (Ammonoidea). Rivista Italiana di Paleontologia e Stratigrafia, 79 (4): 479–502.
Federico Venturi, Carlo Nannarone, Massimiliano Bilotta - Early Pliensbachian ammonites from the Furlo Pass (Marche, Italy): two new faunas for the middle-western Tethys

See also
 List of ammonite genera

References

Jurassic ammonites
Ammonites of Europe
Pliensbachian life
Ammonitida genera
Lytoceratidae